Millrise is a suburban residential neighbourhood in the southwest quadrant of Calgary, Alberta. It is located south of Fish Creek Provincial Park, and is bounded by 146 Avenue S to the north, Macleod Trail to the east, Shawnessy Boulevard to the south and James McKevitt Road to the west.

The land was annexed to the City of Calgary in 1961 and Millrise was established in 1982. It is represented in the Calgary City Council by the Ward 13 councillor.

The community is served by the Fish Creek-Lacombe station of the C-Train LRT system.

Demographics

Residents in this community had a median household income of $70,870 in 2000, and there were 7.6% low income residents living in the neighbourhood. As of 2000, 19.8% of the residents were immigrants. A proportion of 7.5% of the buildings were condominiums or apartments, and 8.5% of the housing was used for renting.

Education
The community is served by Our Lady of Peace Elementary & Junior High (Catholic school).

See also
List of neighbourhoods in Calgary

References

Pictures
Millrise, Calgary, Alberta:

External links
Millrise Community Association

Neighbourhoods in Calgary